Josiah Quincy IV (January 17, 1802 – November 2, 1882) was an American politician. He was mayor of Boston (December 11, 1845 – January 1, 1849), as was his father Josiah Quincy III (mayor in 1823–1828) and grandson Josiah Quincy VI (mayor in 1895–1899).

Career

He attended Philips' Academy, Andover and graduated from Harvard College in 1821.

He was elected a member of the Ancient and Honorable Artillery Company of Massachusetts in 1823 and became its captain in 1829 at the age of 27.

He was the author of Figures of the Past (1883).

As a member of the Massachusetts State Legislature in 1837, he was instrumental in the establishment of the Massachusetts Board of Education. 
He built the Josiah Quincy Mansion in 1848.

He was elected to the Boston City Council in 1833 and served as its president from 1834 to 1857.

He served as mayor of Boston from 1845 to 1849.  He served as treasurer of the Boston Athenaeum from 1837 to 1852.

Travels
In 1844, while traveling with Charles Francis Adams met Joseph Smith, the founder of the Church of Jesus Christ and the Latter Day Saints, in Nauvoo, Illinois, where Adams received a copy of the Book of Mormon which had previously belonged to Smith's first wife, Emma Smith. The book is now in the archive collections of Adams National Historical Park. At the visit, Smith showed Adams and Quincy four Egyptian mummies and ancient papyri. Adams was not impressed by Smith, and wrote in his diary entry that day, "Such a man is a study not for himself, but as serving to show what turns the human mind will sometimes take. And herafter if I should live, I may compare the results of this delusion with the condition in which I saw it and its mountebank apostle."

Family

His brother Edmund (1808–1877) was a prominent abolitionist, and author of the biography of his father and of a romance, Wensley (1854).  A sister, Anna Cabot Lowell Quincy Waterston, was a writer; and another sister, Eliza Susan (1798–1884) was her father's secretary and the biographer of her mother.

Quincy had two sons — Josiah Phillips (1829–1910), a lawyer, who wrote, besides some verse, The Protection of Majorities (1876) and Double Taxation in Massachusetts (1889); and Samuel Miller (1833–1887), who practised law, wrote on legal subjects, served in the Union army during the Civil War, and was breveted brigadier-general of volunteers in 1865. 

A descendant of his, through her mother, was Helen Howe, novelist.

See also
 63rd Massachusetts General Court (1842)
 Timeline of Boston, 1840s

Sources
 William Guild, Description of the Boston and Worcester and Western Railroads: In which is Noted the Towns, Villages, Station, Bridges, Viaducts, Tunnels, Cuttings, Embankments, Gradients, &c., the Scenery and Its Natural History, and Other Objects Passed by this Line of Railway. With Numerous Illustrations, Boston?: Bradbury & Guild, 1847, p. 13.

References 

Attribution

External links
 , contains Quincy's speech of welcome to Boston for Charles Dickens.
 Figures of the Past, by Quincy published in 1883 contains reminiscences of meeting historic figures.

1802 births
1882 deaths
Phillips Academy alumni
Mayors of Boston
Politicians from Quincy, Massachusetts
Presidents of the Massachusetts Senate
Massachusetts state senators
Members of the Massachusetts House of Representatives
Phillips family (New England)
Quincy family
Massachusetts Whigs
19th-century American politicians
Harvard University alumni